Pselnophorus heterodactyla, also known as the short-winged plume, is a moth of the family Pterophoridae found in most of Europe. It was first described by Danish naturalist, Otto Friedrich Müller in 1764.

Description
Adults are on wing in June and July in western Europe.

The larvae feed on wall lettuce (Mycelis muralis), purple lettuce (Prenanthes purpurea), marsh hawk's-beard (Crepis paludosa) and common nipplewort (Lapsana communis). The larvae live on the underside of the leaves, overwintering in the larval stage. In spring they bite through the midrib of the leaf, causing it to wither. Pupation takes place along the stem.

References

External links
microlepidoptera.nl 

Oidaematophorini
Moths described in 1764
Moths of Asia
Plume moths of Europe
Taxa named by Otto Friedrich Müller